Dry Branch (also Drybranch, Pikes Peak) is an unincorporated community located in Twiggs and Bibb counties, Georgia, United States. Its ZIP code is 31020. The area covered by the ZIP code has a population of 3,198 and contains 100.81 square miles of land and is 0.4% water.

History
The first permanent settlement at Dry Branch was made in 1808. A post office has been in operation at Dry Branch since 1879. According to tradition, the community was so named on account of it being a dry area.

References

Macon metropolitan area, Georgia
Unincorporated communities in Georgia (U.S. state)
Unincorporated communities in Bibb County, Georgia
Unincorporated communities in Twiggs County, Georgia